Baptismal vows are the renunciations required of an adult candidate for baptism just before the sacrament is conferred.  In the case of an infant baptism they are given by the godparents (sponsors) or parents themselves. In many Christian denominations, the taking of baptismal vows incorporates a person into church membership.

Questions for candidates
According to the Roman Ritual of the Catholic Church, three questions are addressed to the person to be baptized: "Dost thou renounce Satan? and all his works? and all his pomps?" To each of these interrogation the person, or the sponsor in his name, replies: "I do renounce". The Sunday Service of the Methodists, the first liturgical book of Methodism, contains the following baptismal vows:

Renewal of baptismal vows
In Roman Catholicism, Lutheranism and Anglicanism, the practice of renewing the baptismal promises is more or less widespread and often happens at one's First Holy Communion and Confirmation, as well as annually during the Easter Vigil. Additionally, Martin Luther, the father of the Lutheran Churches, taught that "we are to daily renew our baptism" and as such, when believers rise in the morning, they should proclaim “I am baptized into Christ.” On New Year's Eve, congregations belonging to various Methodist connexions, such as the United Methodist Church, Free Methodist Church and Pilgrim Holiness Church, conduct a watchnight service in the form of the Covenant Renewal Service, so that Methodist believers can personally renew their covenant with God every year; this liturgy is traditionally preceded by prayer and fasting.

References

External links
How can I join the church? - Church of England 

Baptism
Spiritual warfare
Christian terminology